Craig Robert Young (born 4 October 1976) is a British actor who began his acting career at age ten, starring in the stage production of The Price of Coal. By the time he was 17, he moved to London to attend the Central School of Speech and Drama, whereupon he was chosen to become a member of the pop band Deuce, scoring four top 30 single hits: "Call It Love", "I Need You", "On the Bible", and "No Surrender".

Young soon began a successful stint as Alex Wilkinson in the long-running, award-winning British television series Dream Team. In 2001, he moved to Los Angeles, where he soon became a regular on the MTV series Spyder Games. Other television roles followed, including appearances on Hollywood 7, Charmed, Sabrina, the Teenage Witch and The District. Young was also cast in the films Totally Sexy Loser (2003) and Wannabe (2005), the latter of which he co-wrote with director Richard Keith.

In addition to appearing in the Zoey 101 pilot, Young portrayed Coach Moore in Nickelodeon's soccer series Just for Kicks.

He originated the role of Will Fairchild in the play Boise, USA  in 2008.

More recently, he has appeared in The CW's 2009 series Melrose Place, playing Ella Simms's German love-rat famed director Franz Keppler. He recurred on the TV series 10 Things I Hate About You, playing yet another German, Frank Kline. J. J. Abrams has cast him in three of his TV series, Lost, What About Brian, and Fringe.

In July 2010, Young acted in the World War II action thriller Return to the Hiding Place (2011). In 2011, he had a recurring role on NCIS: Los Angeles as Dracul Comescu, an enemy to NCIS Special Agent G. Callen (Chris O'Donnell) with the role even expanding over to the Hawaii Five-0 episode "Pa Make Loa" which was a crossover between both NCIS: Los Angeles and Hawaii Five-0 with Young's role as Comescu ending when his character was shot dead by O'Donnell's character, Callen.

In the spring of 2014, Craig played the role of Nicky Lancaster in Noël Coward's The Vortex. After a wildly successful run in Malibu, he reprised his role with the same cast at The Matrix Theatre in Los Angeles in the winter to rave reviews. In addition, he also played roles in episodes of the TV series Hit the Floor and Hot in Cleveland.

Personal life
Craig Robert Young is gay and married to advertising executive Michael Di Girolamo.

References

External links

 June 20th, 2011 – ActorsE Chat with actor Craig Robert Young and host Judith Jones on Actors Entertainment

1976 births
Living people
Actors from Nottingham
English gay actors
English male film actors
English male television actors
Male actors from Nottinghamshire
20th-century English LGBT people
21st-century English LGBT people